3 Equulei is a single star located in the small northern constellation of Equuleus. It is faintly visible to the naked eye at an apparent visual magnitude of 5.6. Based upon an annual parallax shift of 4.24 mas, 3 Equulei is roughly  distant from Earth, give or take an 80 light-year margin of error. At that distance, the apparent brightness of the star is diminished by 0.15 in visual magnitude because of extinction from interstellar gas and dust.

3 Equuleui has been referred to in some sources as ζ (Zeta) Equuleui, although it was not given that designation by Bayer.

Properties 
3 Equulei is an evolved giant star with a stellar classification of K5 III. At the estimated distance of Delta Ophiuchi, this yields a physical size of about 63 times the radius of the Sun. It is radiating an estimated 949 times the luminosity of the Sun from this expanded outer envelope at an effective temperature of 3,893 K. At this heat, it shines with the orange-hued glow of a K-type star.

References

External links
http://frostydrew.org/stars.dc/star/id-126518/pss-obsy/

Equuleus

K-type giants

Equulei, Zeta
Equulei, 03
Durchmusterung objects
200644
8066
104031